Kali Temple is Goddess Kali temple. The temple is located in RK Beach, Visakhapatnam.

History
This temple was built in 1984 and Vijayadashami festival celebrate hear, this temple is becomes a landmark in Visakhapatnam Beach Road and a good tourist destination.

Transport
This temple is located in Beach Road so all the corners from city is well connected to this temple.

References

Hindu temples in Visakhapatnam district
Kali temples